Cowin Mills (born January 31, 1986) is a Trinidadian sprinter, who specialized in the 400 metres. He is a 2007 NCAA All-American honoree, and a member of the track and field team for the Clemson Tigers. He is also a graduate of management at Clemson University in Clemson, South Carolina.

Mills competed for the men's 4 × 400 m relay at the 2008 Summer Olympics in Beijing, along with his teammates Ato Modibo, Jovon Toppin, and Stann Waithe. He ran on the third leg of the second heat, with an individual-split time of 46.60 seconds. Mills and his team finished the relay in fifth place for a seasonal best time of 3:04.12, failing to advance into the final.

References

External links
 
 TTOC Profile
 NBC Olympics Profile

1986 births
Living people
Trinidad and Tobago male sprinters
Olympic athletes of Trinidad and Tobago
Athletes (track and field) at the 2008 Summer Olympics
Clemson Tigers men's track and field athletes